Salaš (in Serbo-Croatian, Czech and Slovak, from Hungarian szállás meaning "house, accommodation") is a traditional type of farm in the Pannonian Plain region, particularly in Bacska and Slavonia. A salaš is typically remote from a town or village. It consists of a family house, agricultural objects such as barn, stable and granary, surrounded by arable land and pastures. They were owned and inhabited by a single family, who lived there for generations.

The once very numerous "mudhuts" on the plains of central Europe were built from locally found materials: the walls were raised from beaten mud, or mud-and-hay bricks dried in the sun. The roof was usually from dried reed, assembled together in traditional craftsmanship. Today, salaš becomes part of folklore to be shown to tourists, together with traditional foods and beverages, customs, farm life, tamburica music, etc.

In Slovak culture, salaše were remote encampments for shepherds, and eventually came to denote small countryside restaurants established in such houses, providing sheep products and traditional home meals such as bryndzové halušky.

See also
 "Ja sam rođen tamo na salašu" ('I was born there on a farm'), Serbian patriotic song from Vojvodina

References

Types of farms
Ethnography